Clément Ader (2 April 1841 – 3 May 1925) was a French inventor and engineer who was born near Toulouse in Muret, Haute-Garonne, and died in Toulouse. He is remembered primarily for his pioneering work in aviation. In 1870 he was also one of the pioneers in the sport of cycling in France.

Electrical and mechanical inventions 
Ader was an innovator in both electrical and mechanical engineering. He originally studied electrical engineering, and in 1878 improved on the telephone invented by Alexander Graham Bell. After this he established the telephone network in Paris in 1880. In 1881, he invented the théâtrophone, a system of telephonic transmission where listeners received a separate channel for each ear, enabling stereophonic perception of the actors on a set; it was this invention which gave the first stereo transmission of opera performances, over a distance of 2 miles (3 km) in 1881.  In 1903, he devised a V8 engine for the Paris–Madrid race, but although three or four were produced, none was sold.

Aircraft prototypes 

Following his work with V8 engines, Ader turned to the problem of mechanical flight and until the end of his life gave much time and money to this. Using the studies of Louis Pierre Mouillard (1834–1897) on the flight of birds, he constructed his first flying machine in 1886, the Ader Éole. On 9 October 1890 Ader attempted to fly the Éole. Ader also claimed credit for getting off the ground in the Éole.

Ader began construction of a second aircraft he called the Avion II, also referred to as the Zephyr or Éole II. Most sources agree that work on this aircraft was never completed, and it was abandoned in favour of the Avion III.

Ader's progress attracted the interest of the minister of war, Charles de Freycinet. With the backing of the French War Office, Ader developed and constructed the Avion III. Using a circular track at Satory, Ader carried out taxiing trials on 12 October 1897 and two days later attempted a flight. After a short run the machine was caught by a gust of wind, slewed off the track, and came to a stop. After this the French army withdrew its funding, but kept the results secret. The commission released in November 1910 the official reports on Ader's attempted flights, stating that they were unsuccessful.

Book on aviation 
Clément Ader remained an active proponent of the development of aviation. In 1909 he published L'Aviation Militaire, a very popular book which went through 10 editions in the five years before the First World War. It is notable for its vision of aerial warfare and for its foreseeing the form of the modern aircraft carrier, with a flat flight deck, an island superstructure, deck elevators and a hangar bay. His  idea for an aircraft carrier was relayed by the US naval attaché in Paris and was followed by the first trials in the United States in November 1910.

Influence 

Ader is still admired for his early powered flight efforts, and his aircraft gave the French language the word avion for a heavier-than-air aircraft. In 1938, France issued a postage stamp honoring him. Airbus named one of its aircraft assembly sites in Toulouse after him. Clément Ader has been referred to as "the father of aviation".

See also 
 Early flying machines

Notes

Further reading 
 Lissarague, Pierre, Ader, Inventor of Aeroplanes. Toulouse, France: Editions Privat, 1990
  Lissarague, Pierre, Pegasus,the magazine of Musee de l'Air, Nos. 52, 56, 58, . (Articles on restoration of Ader's Aeroplane 3 and on the testing of engines and propellers.)
 Pierre Lissarague and J. Forestier, Icarus  an article on restoration of Ader's Avion 3, No. 134 (October 1990).
 
 Gibbs-Smith C.H., Aviation: An Historical Survey. London, NMSI, 2008.

External links 

 
 Clement Ader
 Clement Ader's flying machines
 Clement Ader's first flight in 1879 ?

1841 births
1925 deaths
People from Muret
Aviation pioneers
Aircraft designers
French aerospace engineers
Aerial warfare pioneers
Commandeurs of the Légion d'honneur